Markos (8th century) was ruler of the Nubian kingdom of Makuria. According to Severus of El Ashmunein, Markos ruled for only six months.1

Markos was made king by the former king Zacharias after he had deposed Abraham and exiled him to an island in the middle of the Nile. According to Severus, this was not sufficient for "the friends of Mark", who decided to "secretly with guile, to slay Abraham in his place of exile. But, when the partisans of king Abraham learnt this, they conspired against king Mark; and, while he was praying in the church before the sanctuary, they slew him".

Notes 
 B. Evetts, History of the Patriarchs of the Coptic Church of Alexandria, Part 3 (1910)

Nubian people
Kingdom of Makuria
8th-century monarchs in Africa